The 1998 Budapest Lotto Open was a women's tennis tournament played on outdoor clay courts in Budapest, Hungary that was part of the Tier IV category of the 1998 WTA Tour. It was the third edition of the tournament and was held from 20 April until 26 April 1998. Seventh-seeded Virginia Ruano Pascual won the singles title and earned $17,700 first-prize money.

Finals

Singles

 Virginia Ruano Pascual defeated  Silvia Farina 6–4, 4–6, 6–3
 It was Ruano Pascual's 1st singles title of the year and the 2nd of her career.

Doubles

 Virginia Ruano Pascual /  Paola Suárez defeated  Cătălina Cristea /  Laura Montalvo 4–6, 6–1, 6–1
 It was Ruano Pascual's 3rd title of the year and the 4th of her career. It was Suárez's 4th title of the year and the 5th of her career.

External links
 ITF tournament edition details
 Tournament draws

Budapest Lotto Open
Budapest Grand Prix
Budapest Lotto Open
Buda
Buda